Topoľníky is a village and municipality in the Dunajská Streda District in the Trnava Region of south-west Slovakia.

History
The village was first recorded in 1113. Local tradition holds that the Mikóczy, Csölle, Nagy, Szalay, Várady, Tóth és Szabó families, millers and fishermen for profession, were the first settlers in the village.

During the Hungarian Revolution and Independence War of 1848-49, a battle took place near the village on 13 January 1849 between the Hungarian troops belonging to the Komárom fortress led by colonel Ferdinand Querlonde and the Austrian imperial troops led by lieutenant colonel Geramb who lost his life in the battle which helped the Hungarians to gain victory.

Until the end of World War I, it was part of Hungary and fell within the Dunaszerdahely district of Pozsony County. After the Austro-Hungarian army disintegrated in November 1918, Czechoslovak troops occupied the area. After the Treaty of Trianon of 1920, the village became officially part of Czechoslovakia. In November 1938, the First Vienna Award granted the area to Hungary and it was held by Hungary until 1945. The villages of Felsőnyárasd and Alsónyárasd were unified to form the present-day municipality in 1940. After Soviet occupation in 1945, Czechoslovak administration returned and the village became officially part of Czechoslovakia in 1947. Its original Slovak name derived from the Hungarian form as Náražd, but it was Slovakised by the authorities to the current official name in 1948.

Demography 
At the 2001 Census the recorded population of the village was 3015 while an end-2008 estimate by the Statistical Office had the villages's population as 3013. As of 2001, 93,03 per cent of its population was Hungarian while 5,24 per cent was Slovak. Roman Catholicism is the majority religion of the village, its adherents numbering 83.32% of the total population.

Geography
The municipality lies at an altitude of 111 metres and covers an area of 34.820 km2.

References

External links
Local school website 

Villages and municipalities in Dunajská Streda District
Hungarian communities in Slovakia